Peter Miller (2 February 1858 – 11 October 1914) was a Scottish footballer who played as a centre-half.

Career
Miller played football for Dumbarton, Partick, and Scotland.

Honours
Dumbarton
 Scottish Cup: Winners 1882–83 - Runners Up 1880–81;1881–82;1886–87
 Dumbartonshire Cup: Winners 1884–85
 Glasgow Charity Cup: Runners Up 1881–82;1884–85
 3 caps for Scotland between 1881 and 1883
 4 representative caps for Scotch Counties between 1881 and 1883
 6 representative caps for Dumbartonshire between 1884 and 1887
 6 international trial matches for Scotland between 1878 and 1884.

References

External links

Peter Miller (Dumbarton Football Club Historical Archive)
London Hearts profile

1858 births
1914 deaths
Scottish footballers
Scotland international footballers
Dumbarton F.C. players
Association football central defenders
Partick F.C. players